
Gmina Bielice is a rural gmina (administrative district) in Pyrzyce County, West Pomeranian Voivodeship, in north-western Poland.

Villages
Gmina Bielice contains the villages and settlements of Babin, Babinek, Bielice, Chabówko, Chabowo, Linie, Nowe Chrapowo, Nowe Linie, Parsów, Stare Chrapowo and Swochowo.

Neighbouring gminas
Gmina Bielice is bordered by the gminas of Banie, Gryfino, Kozielice, Pyrzyce and Stare Czarnowo.

References
Polish official population figures 2006

Bielice
Pyrzyce County